Cazuza: O Tempo Não Pára (Cazuza: Time Doesn't Stop) is a 2004 Brazilian biographical musical drama film directed by Sandra Werneck and Walter Carvalho, about the life of singer Cazuza. It stars Daniel de Oliveira as Cazuza. The film is based on the 1997 biography Cazuza: Só as Mães São Felizes by Cazuza's mother, Lucinha Araújo. The film won a Best Actor Award from the São Paulo Association of Art Critics Awards. It was one of the most successful films of the year in Brazil.

Synopsis
Focusing on Cazuza's personal life, the film chronicles his early career, his subsequent success, his drug use and his promiscuous lifestyle. It starts out in the early 1980s in Rio de Janeiro, showing his usual day-to-day life until he joins the band which would become Barão Vermelho. It then shows the band's rise to fame and its frequent "mutinies" which led him to pursue a solo career. Later, it depicts his struggle against the AIDS virus and his final days.

Cast

References

External links
  
 

2004 films
2004 biographical drama films
2004 LGBT-related films
2000s musical drama films
2000s Portuguese-language films
Biographical films about LGBT people
Biographical films about singers
Brazilian biographical drama films
Brazilian LGBT-related films
Brazilian musical drama films
Brazilian rock music films
Cultural depictions of rock musicians
HIV/AIDS in film
Films based on biographies
Films set in the 1980s
Films set in 1990
Films set in Rio de Janeiro (city)
LGBT-related musical drama films